The Guild of Play was founded by Dame Grace Kimmins (1871–1954) and others from the Passmore Edwards Settlement to provide structured play for city girls.

Objective
To provide a civilising influence away from the city streets by reviving the old Merrie England idealised lifestyle.

Related organisations
The Bermondsey Settlement
The Chailey Heritage
The Guild of the Poor Brave Things
The Passmore Edwards Settlement

Related people of influence
 John Passmore Edwards
 Millicent Garrett Fawcett
 Hugh Price Hughes and wife Katherine
 Lord Llangattock
 Mary Neal
 Emmeline Pethick-Lawrence (sometimes written Emmeline Pethick, or with the hyphen omitted)
 Mary Ward
 Brian Kimmins

External links
Grace Kimmins and Playwork

Youth organisations based in the United Kingdom